Ömer Kadri Özcan (21 June 1952 – 22 October 2013) was a Turkish football player and coach, who primarily played as a defender.

Death
Özcan died of a heart attack on 22 October 2013, aged 61, in his hometown of Akçaabat, Trabzon Province.

References

External links
 

1952 births
2013 deaths
People from Akçaabat
Turkish footballers
Turkey international footballers
Turkish football managers
Association football defenders